JKK may refer to:
 Jan Krzysztof Kelus (born 1942), Polish poet and singer
 Jawahar Kala Kendra, an arts centre in Jaipur, India
 Spanair, a defunct Spanish airline